MEG Energy is a pure play Canadian oil sands producer engaged in exploration in Northern Alberta. The company's main thermal project is Christina Lake.  85-megawatt cogeneration plants are used to produce the steam used in SAGD which is required to bring bitumen to the surface. The excess heat and electricity produced at its plants is then sold to Alberta's power grid. The value of those reserves is over $19.8 billion. CNOOC has a minority 16.69% interest in MEG Energy.

Within nine months of going public it reached large cap company status after a small cap ipo.  As recently as 2007 it was a junior oil company.

History
MEG Energy was founded in 1999 as McCaffrey Energy Group Inc by CEO and President Bill McCaffrey, Director and Corporate Secretary David Wizinsky and former Director Steve Turner.  It went public with an IPO of $660 million in August 2010.  At the time it was considered a $9.7 billion equity cap company.  The Christina Lake project first received approval from the government in 2008, it was one of six oil megaprojects in Canada that year.

April 14, 2005 - CNOOC Ltd, China's 3rd biggest oil and natural gas company purchased a 16.69% interest in MEG Energy for $C150 million (13.6 million common shares).

Production
In 2012 bitumen production averaged 28,773 bpd, +2,168 bpd versus the previous year.  By the second quarter of 2013 average production had reached 32,144 bpd, +1,715 bdp.  Also up is the realized oil price per barrel: $53.98 vs $45.59.

Christina Lake
MEG's interest in Christina Lake includes 80 blocks/sections.  It is a three phase project that was operating at 12.4% (26,000 bbls/d) of total expected production capacity at the end of 2010.  Since 2009 the first two phases were producing, albeit at a low level because construction of phase 2B (design capacity 40% larger than phase 1 and 2A combined) didn't begin until 2011.  When combined with phase three, total production will exceed  with 2020 production estimated at 260,000 bbls/d.  The pipeline system used to carry bitumen out and diluent in is the  Access Pipeline which MEG co owns with Devon ARL Corp.

Phase 3 - the most important part of the project is currently awaiting regulatory approval (May 2011).

The company operates the Christina Lake Aerodrome.

Cenovus Energy also produces at Christina Lake.

Surmont
Production isn't expected to begin until 2018.

Takeover Bid 
In October 2018, Husky Energy put it in a hostile take over bid to acquire MEG Energy Corp.

Initial production process
Initially two horizontally parallel wells are created.  Oil is directed to the lowest well after injecting steam into the one above it in order to heat the area so that the liquid in the area flows downwards (allows for the separation of oil from sand).  The steam used comes from MEG's cogeneration plants.

References

Companies listed on the Toronto Stock Exchange
Oil companies of Canada
Bituminous sands of Canada
Non-renewable resource companies established in 1999
Companies based in Calgary
1999 establishments in Alberta